Calexico High School is a public high school located in Calexico, California.

Statistics

Demographics 
2020-2021 Enrollment by Ethnicity:

Notable alumni 
 Kiki Camarena - DEA Agent

References 

Public high schools in California
High schools in Imperial County, California